Ultimate Wrestling Israel (UWI), the fourth wrestling federation in Israel was founded in November 2015. The UWI currently has one belt, the UWI Shomer Shabbos Heavyweight Championship, previously known as the UWI Heavyweight Championship until February 2017.

UWI Shomer Shabbos Heavyweight Championship
UWI Heavyweight Championship crowned its first champion on 5 March 2016. On 1 February 2017 it was renamed to the UWI Shomer Shabbos Heavyweight Championship.

Original tournament

The tournament to crown the original holder of the UWI Heavyweight Championship was held over the source of three separate shows. 10 December 2015 saw the quarterfinals at UWI Showdown. On 7 January 2016 at UWI Gold Rush, there were the semifinals of the tournament. The finals were held on 5 March 2016 at UWI There Can Only Be One.

Reigns

Combined reigns

See also
 Professional wrestling in Israel

References

Israeli professional wrestling promotions
2015 establishments in Israel
Organizations established in 2015
Organizations based in Netanya